= Partition of Yugoslavia =

Partition of Yugoslavia may refer to:

- Invasion of Yugoslavia, where the Axis powers partitioned it (1941)
- Breakup of Yugoslavia, where the constituent republics partitioned it (1991–1992)
